The governor of Davao del Norte, is the chief executive of the provincial government of Davao del Norte.

Provincial Governors (1968-2025)

References

Governors of Davao del Norte
Davao del Norte